Albert Kyle Johnson (born December 15, 1978 in Wheaton, Illinois) is a former American football fullback. He was originally drafted by the Carolina Panthers in the fifth round of the 2002 NFL Draft. He played college football at Syracuse.

High school career
As a senior at Woodbridge High School in Woodbridge Township, New Jersey, Johnson won second-team All-State recognition, All-County honors, and All-Area honors.

College career
Johnson played collegiately for Syracuse. However, an ankle injury ended his season in the opener but still had 20 touchdowns; he was subsequently granted a sixth year of eligibility by the NCAA.

Professional career
Kyle was drafted by the Carolina Panthers as the 10th pick in the 5th round of the 2002 NFL Draft. He was cut by the team after training camp and spent time on the New York Giants and Detroit Lions' practice squads.

He was signed by Denver to their active roster in late 2002, but was inactive for the remainder of the season and spent the next year being shuffled between the active roster and the practice squad. He began 2004 with the Broncos as a backup and special teams player; however, injuries led to starting fullback Reuben Droughns being moved to tailback, leaving the fullback spot to Johnson. However, after three starts, he suffered a season-ending injury to his right ankle.  Thereafter, Johnson was the starting fullback for the next several years serving as a valuable run blocker and pass catcher within the Mike Shanahan offense.  During the 2006 regular season with the Denver Broncos, Johnson scored a career-high 6 touchdowns (5 catching and 1 rushing). His touchdowns often ended in his signature "Bucking Bronco" celebration dance.

On September 1, 2007, Johnson was cut from the Denver Broncos. He re-signed with the Broncos on November 22, 2007 when guard Isaac Snell was cut to make room for Johnson due to the injuries of Travis Henry, Selvin Young and Paul Smith. He was cut again on November 27, 2007.

References

External links
Denver Broncos bio

1978 births
Living people
People from Woodbridge Township, New Jersey
American football fullbacks
Syracuse Orange football players
Carolina Panthers players
New York Giants players
Detroit Lions players
Denver Broncos players
Players of American football from New Jersey
Sportspeople from Middlesex County, New Jersey
Woodbridge High School (New Jersey) alumni